Kristian Tsvetanov Gkolomeev (born 4 July 1993) is a Greek swimmer. He specializes in sprint freestyle and butterfly events.

At the 2012 Summer Olympics, he competed in the Men's 100 metre freestyle, finishing in 31st place (50.08) overall in the heats, failing to qualify for the semifinals.

At the 2016 Summer Olympics, he competed in the men's 50 metre freestyle, finishing 10th in the heats with a time of 21.93 seconds. He qualified for the semifinals where he finished 13th with a time of 21.98 seconds and did not qualify for the final. He also competed in the men's 100 metre freestyle, finishing in 20th place with a time of 48.68 seconds which was a new national record. He did not qualify for the semifinals.

Gkolomeev was also part of the men's 4 × 100 m freestyle relay team which finished 10th in the heats and did not advance to the final and the men's 4 × 100 m medley relay team which finished 15th in the heats and did not advance to the final.

Gkolomeev earned Greece’s second ever World Championship medal in swimming, as he finished second at the 50 meters freestyle final at the 2019 FINA World Aquatics Championships in South Korea. The Greek champion was joint second with Brazil’s Bruno Fratus, clocking 21.45 seconds, behind American Caeleb Dressel.

Personal life
Kristian Gkolomeev was born on 4 July 1993 in Velingrad, Bulgaria. His mother, Kristina Golomeeva, died due to a medical error soon after giving birth to Kristian. They moved in Greece when he was an infant. His father, Tsvetan Golomeev, was a famous Bulgarian swimmer. He died in 2010 after an eight-month fight with cancer. Kristian Gkolomeev has two brothers – Nikola and Ivan. In 2018, he married a fellow swimmer, Lindsay Morrow Gkolomeev, from his alma mater, the University of Alabama.

Career
At 2011 FINA World Junior Swimming Championships – Lima (PER) Kristian Gkolomeev took 3rd place with time 22.80 (50m freestyle).
At the 14th Luxembourg Euro Meet (27.29 January 2012) Gkolomeev finished 9th at Men's 100m freestyle with time 51.31 and was 4th at Men's 50m freestyle (22.92).

Other achievements
 World Junior Championships:
Lima 2011: Bronze 50m freestyle, 4th place 4x100m medley
 European Junior Championships:
Belgrade 2011: Silver 50m freestyle
 Balkan Junior Swimming Championships:
Banja Luka 2011: Gold 50m freestyle, Gold 4x100m freestyle, Bronze 100m freestyle
 Multination Junior Swimming Meeting:
Corfu 2011: Gold 50m freestyle, Bronze 4x100m freestyle
 European Championships Long Course:
14th Luxembourg Euro Meet 2012: 9th place 100m freestyle, 4th place 50m freestyle
Debrecen 2012: 4th 50m freestyle
 Olympic Games:
Tokyo 2020: 5th place (21.72) 50m freestyle
Rio 2016: 13th place (21.98) 50m freestyle
Rio 2016: 20th place (48.68) NR 100m freestyle
London 2012: 31st place (50.08) 100m freestyle

Media reviews
"The young swimmer is very talented and shows that he can have a lot of good results to the next games... he tries very hard and in every game he tries to get better times. I'm sure that he can succeed a lot of great things." – Mike Kontorinis, journalist of Aquatics News

References

External links

Greek male swimmers
1993 births
Living people
Olympic swimmers of Greece
Greek people of Bulgarian descent
Swimmers at the 2012 Summer Olympics
Swimmers at the 2016 Summer Olympics
Greek male freestyle swimmers
Place of birth missing (living people)
Mediterranean Games gold medalists for Greece
Mediterranean Games silver medalists for Greece
Mediterranean Games bronze medalists for Greece
Panathinaikos swimmers
Swimmers at the 2013 Mediterranean Games
Swimmers at the 2018 Mediterranean Games
European Aquatics Championships medalists in swimming
Mediterranean Games medalists in swimming
World Aquatics Championships medalists in swimming
People from Velingrad
Swimmers at the 2020 Summer Olympics
20th-century Greek people
21st-century Greek people
Swimmers at the 2022 Mediterranean Games
Alabama Crimson Tide men's swimmers